Alan Clarkson may refer to:
 Alan Clarkson (priest)
 Alan Clarkson (swimmer)